Asian Highway 63 (AH63) is a road in the Asian Highway Network running 2500 km from Samara, Russia to G‘uzor, Uzbekistan connecting AH6 to AH62. 
The route is also numbered European route E121 and European route E40.

The route is as follows:

Russia
: Samara - Bolshaya Chernigovka - border with  Kazakhstan

Kazakhstan
: Pogodaevo - Oral
: Oral - Atyrau
: Atyrau - Dossor
: Dossor - Beyneu
: Beyneu - Akjikit

Uzbekistan
 Karakalpakstan - Nukus - Bukhara - G‘uzor

Asian Highway Network
Roads in Uzbekistan
Roads in Kazakhstan
Roads in Russia